Kwbholasothar is a rural municipality in the Lamjung District in Gandaki Province of central Nepal.  On 10 March 2017, The Federal Affairs and Local Development implemented the new local administrative structure consisting of 744 local units. Kwbholasothar is a local municipal unit in Lamjung. It is created by merging (1,2,5,6) wards of Balungpani, Maling, Uttarkanya, Bhujung, Pasagaun, Bhoje and Gilung. The total population of Kwbholasothar is 10,032. And the total area is 175.37 km2. It is divided into 9 wards. The administrative center of the rural municipality is located at former Maling V.D.C.. The rural municipality is surrounded by Besisahar Municipality; Marsyandi Rural Municipality in the east, Kaski District is in the west, Kaski District and Marsyandi Rural Municipality are located in the north and Madhya Nepal Municipality and Besisahar Municipality are situated in the south.

References

Rural municipalities in Lamjung District
Rural municipalities of Nepal established in 2017